The Women's giant slalom competition of the 2018 Winter Paralympics was held at Jeongseon Alpine Centre, South Korea. The competition took place on 14 March 2018.

Medal table

Visually impaired
In the downhill visually impaired, athlete with a visual impairment have a sighted guide. The two skiers are considered a team, and dual medals are awarded.

The first run was started at 09:30, with the second run at 14:15.

Standing
Standing run 1 results
Standing full results

Sitting
Sitting run 1 results
Sitting full results

See also
Alpine skiing at the 2018 Winter Olympics

References

Women's giant slalom
Para